Reverend Fr. Stephen Theodore Badin (born Étienne Théodore Badin on July 17, 1768 – April 21, 1853) was the first Catholic priest ordained in the United States. He spent most of his long career ministering to widely dispersed Catholics in Canada and in what became the states of Kentucky, Ohio, Indiana, Michigan, and Illinois.

Early life
Stephen Theodore Badin was born in Orléans, France, and educated at Montaigu College in Paris. He began theological studies at the Sulpician seminary there, and had been ordained a deacon, but was forced to flee in 1791 with other Sulpicians as the revolutionary government closed the seminary and further persecutions were expected. After sailing from Bordeaux to Philadelphia with Benedict Joseph Flaget and J. B. David (probably due to the good offices of Fenwick & Mason, the American consuls in Bordeaux), Badin completed his theological studies with the Sulpicians and was ordained a priest by Bishop John Carroll on May 25, 1793, in Baltimore, Maryland. He studied English with the Jesuits at what would later become Georgetown University, for much of his missionary work would be among the Maryland Catholics now settling across the Appalachian mountains, as well as with Catholics of French descent who had settled in the Great Lakes region.

Missionary
Fathers Badin and Michel Barriere set out on foot for Kentucky on September 3, 1793, about a year after Flaget. They crossed the Appalachian mountains, then took a flatboat down the Ohio River to Maysville, Kentucky, from where they walked to Lexington. Badin went to White Sulfur Springs, Kentucky and established a mission named in honor of St. Francis de Sales. In April, 1794 Barriere left Bardstown, Kentucky for New Orleans but Badin established the home base for his missionary journeys on Pottinger's Creek, perhaps after consultation with Jean DuBois. For the next 14 years Badin travelled on foot, horseback and boat between widely scattered Catholic settlements in Kentucky and the Northwest Territory. One estimate puts his travels at over 100,000 miles. In 1806 he received permanent help with the arrival of Rev. Charles Nerinckx. To their relief, in 1808, Bardstown became a diocese in its own right, with Benedict Joseph Flaget as the first bishop, although he did not arrive at that post for another three years and the following year returned to Baltimore with Badin to discuss land title and other problems. J. B. David was ordained a bishop and named Flaget's co-adjutor in 1817, but he tried to refuse the difficult position.

Badin returned to France in 1819, perhaps after continuing controversy concerning land titles near Bardstown or anti-Catholicism or race and the eviction of the Choctaw Native Americans (since the Choctaw Indian Academy was established at White Sulfur Springs in 1825, perhaps succeeding an earlier school there). While there Badin ministered to two parishes, Millaney and Marreilly-en-Gault, near Orléans, the city of his birth, for several years. However, he also worked constantly to secure gifts of money and church furniture to send to the Kentucky mission churches. In 1822, he published a "Statement of the Missions in Kentucky" (Etat des Missiones du Kentucky).

Badin returned to resume his missionary activity in the America in 1828, first to Detroit and other early settlements in what became Michigan, then returning to Kentucky in 1829. In 1830 Badin offered his services to Bishop Edward Fenwick of the Archdiocese of Cincinnati, which oversaw missionary work with the Potawatomi Indians. The Potawatomi Chief Leopold Pokagon, who had converted to Catholicism, traveled to Detroit in 1830 to ask a priest be sent among his tribe. Badin, who was in Detroit visiting his brother, was asked to accept. In administering to the Potawatomi, Badin employed a translator as he considered himself too old to learn the language. He unsuccessfully tried to found a school and an orphanage, and then in 1832 he purchased 524 acres of land around South Bend, half from the government and half from two landowners. He then built a log chapel to serve as chapel and residence, and later gave the land to the bishop on condition that an orphanage and school be built. The log chapel eventually burned down in 1856, but a replica was built in 1906. From this outpost, Badin visited Fort Dearborn (the future Chicago) in October 1830, and possibly several other times (writing during an 1846 visit that such marked the fiftieth anniversary of his first visit). In 1836, given his advanced age, Badin decided to leave his Indian mission to his successor, Father Louis Desaille.

After most of the Potawatomi were relocated west to Council Bluffs, Iowa (despite their non participation in the Black Hawk War) and pursuant to a treaty signed in Chicago in 1833, Badin was named vicar of the diocese of Bardstown in 1837. He continued missionary work as well as defended Catholicism, particularly in a series of "Letters to an Episcopalian Friend" published in the Catholic Telegraph of Cincinnati in 1836. In September 1846, Badin accepted a position offered by Bishop Quarter of the new Diocese of Chicago, and became pastor of the French settlement at Bourbonnais Grove, in what became Kankakee County, Illinois. Badin remained there for two years before taking one last missionary trip through the Kentucky diocese in 1848 (which lasted about two years). He also gave considerable land to the diocese of Bardstown/Louisville, and wrote a poem in French about the Battle of Tippecanoe.

Badin gave  of land near South Bend, Indiana to the Diocese of Vincennes, which had been created in 1834.  This later became the site of the University of Notre Dame. Badin also organized the first orphanage in the state of Indiana, in 1834, under the direction of two religious women from Kentucky, Sister Lucina Whitaker and Sister Magadalen Jackson.

Later years and death

About 1850 Badin returned to Cincinnati. Although his friend Bishop Fenwick had died in 1832, his successor, Bishop John Baptist Purcell offered the aging missionary a place at the bishop's residence. Father Badin also served at St. Mary's Church in nearby Hamilton, Ohio. He died at the old episcopal residence on Plum Street in 1853, and was buried at the cathedral crypt. In 1906 his body was re-interred at the University of Notre Dame, Indiana in the recently completed replica log chapel on the site of the chapel Badin had erected there eight decades earlier.

Legacy
A Catholic High School, Father Stephen T. Badin High School, located in Hamilton, Ohio was named in his honor.  There is a Badin Hall on the campus of the University of Notre Dame in Indiana.

References

1768 births
History of Catholicism in the United States
American Roman Catholic priests
French emigrants to the United States
French Roman Catholic missionaries
Clergy from Orléans
University of Notre Dame people
1853 deaths
History of Catholicism in Indiana
Roman Catholic missionaries in Canada
Roman Catholic missionaries in the United States